Nadowli District is a former district that was located in Upper West Region, Ghana. Originally created as an ordinary district assembly in 1988. However on 28 June 2012, it was split off into two new districts: Nadowli-Kaleo District (capital: Nadowli) and Daffiama-Bussie-Issa District (capital: Issa). The district assembly was located in the western part of Upper West Region and had Nadowli as its capital town.

Geography
Nadowli District borders the Wa West District and the Wa Municipal District in the south. Nadowli District has a low-lying topography generally undulating between 150 m and 300 m but in some parts reaching an average of 600 m.

Economy
Agriculture is the most important economic sector of Nadowli District, accounting for about 85% of the labor force. The commercial and industrial sectors are less developed.

See also
 
 GhanaDistricts.com
 Nadowli District Official Website

Sources

Districts of Upper West Region